Thomas Bing (born 3 April 1990 in Bad Salzungen) is a German cross-country skier.

Cross-country skiing results
All results are sourced from the International Ski Federation (FIS).

Olympic Games

World Championships

World Cup

Season standings

References

External links

1990 births
Living people
People from Bad Salzungen
People from Bezirk Suhl
German male cross-country skiers
Tour de Ski skiers
Sportspeople from Thuringia
Olympic cross-country skiers of Germany
Cross-country skiers at the 2014 Winter Olympics
Cross-country skiers at the 2018 Winter Olympics